Stanley Opoku Aborah (born 23 June 1987) is a former professional footballer who  played as an attacking midfielder. He holds both a Ghanaian passport and a Belgian passport.

Club career

Early career
Aborah was born in Kumasi, Ghana, and has had Belgian nationality since he was 10 years old. He had spells at R.S.C. Anderlecht, Cappellen, AA Gent and Germinal Beerschot before joining the Ajax youth team in 2001. His father, Stanley Aborah, Snr, a former Ghana international, operated as a defensive midfielder and played at clubs including Germinal Ekeren (now Germinal Beerschot).

Ajax
As a former Jong Ajax captain, he stepped into the senior Ajax squad in 2004–05 and made his debut on 16 October 2004, against SC Heerenveen. Aborah came on as a substitute in the teams UEFA Champions League victory against Maccabi Tel Aviv coming on for Rafael van der Vaart three days later.

FC Den Bosch (loan)
Ajax loaned him in the 2005–06 season to second division F.C. Den Bosch to gain more experience. Aborah took part in 21 matches with this club and scored three goals.

F.C.V. Dender E.H.
On 3 January 2007, he signed for Belgian Second Division side FCV Dender EH on a free transfer.

Return to FC Den Bosch
In the summer of 2007, Aborah signed a two-year contract with his former club Den Bosch.

As Trenčin
In 2010, he left Bosch and joined second division Slovakian team; AS Trenčín.

Gillingham
Aborah joined Gillingham of England's Football League Two on a one-month contract in August 2010, which was subsequently extended to two months. He made his Gillingham debut in a 1–0 defeat away to Bradford City on 18 September 2010, but this proved to be his only appearance for the club, as he was released from his contract on 5 October.

Vitesse
After a spell with Cappellen Aborah joined Eredivise side Vitesse. He made 13 league appearances scoring one goal.

ND Mura 05
Aborah joined ND Mura in 2012 and made 12 league appearances.

Ferencváros
Aborah then joined Ferencvárosi TC after leaving ND Mura.

Notts County
In July 2015, Aborah signed for Notts County after having a trial with the Nottinghamshire side. He remained with the club until he was released on 31 January 2017.

Portsmouth
Aborah subsequently signed for Portsmouth but was released after just 4 appearances, 3 of them as a substitute, in the summer of 2017.

Waterford
In January 2018 Aborah signed for League of Ireland Premier Division side Waterford. Aborah made his debut in a 2–1 win against Derry City on 17 February 2018.

International career
Aborah has dual Ghanaian and Belgian citizenship. He was a Belgium youth (U18) international.

References

External links
 
 Stanley Aborah Interview

1987 births
Living people
Footballers from Kumasi
Ghanaian emigrants to Belgium
Belgian footballers
Ghanaian footballers
Association football midfielders
AFC Ajax players
FC Den Bosch players
F.C.V. Dender E.H. players
AS Trenčín players
Gillingham F.C. players
SBV Vitesse players
ND Mura 05 players
Ferencvárosi TC footballers
Slovenian PrvaLiga players
Notts County F.C. players
Eredivisie players
Eerste Divisie players
Challenger Pro League players
Belgian expatriate footballers
Nemzeti Bajnokság I players
Expatriate footballers in the Netherlands
Expatriate footballers in Slovakia
Expatriate footballers in England
Expatriate footballers in Slovenia
Expatriate footballers in Hungary
Ghanaian expatriate sportspeople in the Netherlands
Ghanaian expatriate sportspeople in Slovakia
Ghanaian expatriate sportspeople in England
Ghanaian expatriate sportspeople in Slovenia
Ghanaian expatriate sportspeople in Hungary
Belgian expatriate sportspeople in the Netherlands
Belgian expatriate sportspeople in Slovakia
Belgian expatriate sportspeople in England
Belgian expatriate sportspeople in Slovenia
Belgian expatriate sportspeople in Hungary
Royal Cappellen F.C. players
Portsmouth F.C. players
Waterford F.C. players
English Football League players